Laconia is a community in the Canadian province of Nova Scotia, located in the Lunenburg Municipal District in Lunenburg County.

Laconia is located about 13.5 south west of Bridgewater, NS.

Local family names include Eisnor and Eisenhauer as evidenced by the records of Laconia Road cemetery.

References

Communities in Lunenburg County, Nova Scotia
General Service Areas in Nova Scotia